Chris Dagradi (born August 21, 1954 in New York) is an American artist, who lives and works in the Netherlands since 1978. He works as painter, sculptor and ceramist.

Life and work 
Dagradi studied at the Cooper Union in New York City from 1974 to 1977, at the Willem de Kooning Academy in Rotterdam and at Ateliers '63 in Haarlem.

Originally Dagradi worked in abstract expressionist style. His paintings contain strong lines and colors, the layering and depth noticeable. In the 1990s he settled in Delft, where he found an ancient shard of pottery. Ever since he is fascinated by the Delftware and the possibilities offered by the painting of tiles and ceramics, and makes plates, tile panels, mosaic and tiles with relief. He got experience with this technique through his work as a painter at the Delft Pauw and as a production assistant at Royal Delft.

Dagradi exhibited among other in the Museum Het Prinsenhof in Delft and the Dutch Tile Museum in Otterlo. For the Delft district Wippolder Dagradi made a tableau with the map of the district.

Gallery

See also 
 List of Dutch ceramists

References

External links 

 Chris Dagradi, Homepage

1954 births
Living people
American ceramists
Cooper Union alumni
People from New York (state)